Bullock Creek High School is a 9-12 public high school six miles southwest of Midland, Michigan in Homer Township.  It is part of the Bullock Creek Public Schools District.

Athletics
The Bullock Creek athletic teams are known as the Lancers and the school colors are black and gold.  The Lancers compete in the Tri-Valley Conference.  Bullock Creek High School has been a member of the Tri-Valley Conference since 1979.

The following MHSAA sanctioned sports are offered at Bullock Creek High School:

Cross Country (girls & boys) 
Football (boys) 
Soccer (boys and girls) 
Tennis (boys and girls) 
Volleyball (girls) 
Basketball (girls & boys) 
Bowling (girls & boys)
Competitive Cheerleading (girls)
Wrestling (boys) 
Baseball (boys) 
Golf (girls & boys) 
Softball (girls) 
Track & field (girls & boys)

Notable alumni
 Keegan Akin, Major League Baseball pitcher
 Dick Lange, former Major League Baseball pitcher

References

External links 
 Bullock Creek High School website

Public high schools in Michigan